Emeka Obidile (born 27 August 1977) is a Nigerian former professional footballer who played as a midfielder.

Career
Obidile began his career in the German Regionalliga, playing with Atlas Delmenhorst and Spandauer SV. He moved to Poland, where he played for Odra Opole before joining Petro Płock in early 2000. He appeared in seven Ekstraklasa matches for Petro Płock.

Obidile spent the next two seasons in Greece, making 16 Beta Ethniki appearances for Panserraikos. He finished his career in the United Kingdom, including a spell with Dumbarton in the Scottish Football League Second Division, that ended in January 2004.

References

1977 births
Living people
Nigerian footballers
Atlas Delmenhorst players
Wisła Płock players
Panserraikos F.C. players
Dumbarton F.C. players
Buckingham Town F.C. players
Association football midfielders
Odra Opole players
Cowdenbeath F.C. players
Nigerian expatriate footballers
Nigerian expatriate sportspeople in Germany
Expatriate footballers in Germany
Nigerian expatriate sportspeople in Poland
Expatriate footballers in Poland
Nigerian expatriate sportspeople in Greece
Expatriate footballers in Greece
Nigerian expatriate sportspeople in Scotland
Expatriate footballers in Scotland